Madecorformica is a monotypic beetle genus in the family Buprestidae, the jewel beetles. The only species is Madecorformica silhouetta, native to Madagascar.

This beetle is an ant-mimic.

References

External links

Monotypic beetle genera
Buprestidae